Q65 can refer to:

 Q65 (band), a Dutch rock band
 Q65 (New York City bus)
 At-Talaq, the 65th surah of the Quran